Karula Pikkjärv Landscape Conservation Area is a nature park in Valga County, Estonia.

Its area is 364 ha.

In 1959, the Karula Pikkjärv was taken under protection. In 1964, the protected area (Karula Pikkjärv plus its surrounding areas) was established.

References

Nature reserves in Estonia
Geography of Valga County